Bryanston School is a public school (English private boarding and day school for pupils aged 13–18) located next to the village of Bryanston, and near the town of Blandford Forum, in Dorset in South West England. It was founded in 1928.

Bryanston is a member of the Headmasters' and Headmistresses' Conference and the Eton Group. It has a reputation as a liberal and artistic school using some ideas of the Dalton Plan.

History

Founding ethos 

Bryanston was founded in 1928 by a young schoolmaster from Australia named J. G. Jeffreys. Armed only with his confidence and enthusiasm, he gained financial support for the school during a period of severe economic instability with financial backing from Anthony Ashley-Cooper, 9th Earl of Shaftesbury, he paid £35,000 for the Bryanston House and its  of immediate grounds.

The school occupies a palatial country house designed and built in 1889–1894 by Richard Norman Shaw and modelled on the chateau at Menars in the Loire valley. Shaw designed the house for Viscount Portman to replace an earlier one. The building and estate was the biggest in Dorset and the last of the grand stately homes to be built in England. The home had been occupied by the Portman family for 30 years at the time of its sale, but death duties made it impossible for the 4th Lord Portman to hold on to his family estate.

There were just seven teachers and 23 boys of various ages in the first term. Jeffreys innovated whilst respecting good traditions, reflected in his choice of school motto, Et Nova Et Vetera. His was the first English school to adopt the Dalton Plan, its combination of the new and the old being of particular appeal. The system was flexible enough to offer a combination of lessons in the classroom and time for assignment work in subject rooms, which gave the students freedom to decide which pieces of academic work to focus their attention. Students are required to keep a daily record on a chart showing their use of working and leisure time, meeting with their tutors on a weekly basis to ensure effective monitoring of their progress.

Subsequent developments
The school opened on 24 January 1928 with 23 pupils and seven members of staff. In 2004, the school had around 650 pupils and 80 teachers.

During the mid-1930s, Bryanston School was the location of Anglo-German youth camps where the Hitler Youth and Boy Scouts tried to develop links.

The Don Potter Art School opened in 1997.
Bryanston is a member of the Headmasters' and Headmistresses' Conference and the Eton Group. It has a reputation as a liberal and artistic school. The principles of the Dalton Plan are still in place today and remain central to the school's success.

In 2005, the school was one of fifty of the country's leading independent schools which were found guilty of running an illegal price-fixing cartel.

In 2014, the school opened a new music building, the Tom Wheare Music School, designed by Hopkins Architects and named after a headteacher of Bryanston. The 300-seat concert hall was named after conductor Sir Mark Elder, who is a former pupil. The interior of the building won a 2015 Wood Award.

Houses
 Allan (Girls)
 Beechwood (Junior Boys)
 Cranborne (Junior Boys)
 Connaught (Senior Boys)
 Dorset (Senior Boys)
 Greenleaves (Girls) 
 Harthan (Girls)
 Hunter (Girls) 
 Portman (Senior Boys)
 Purbeck (Girls) 
 Salisbury (Senior Boys)
 Shaftesbury (Senior Boys)

Heads of Bryanston
 J. G. Jeffreys (1928–32)
 Thorold Coade (1932–59)
 Robson Fisher (1959–74)
 Rev. David Jones (1974–82)
 Bob Allan (acting head, 1982–83)
 Tom Wheare (1983–2005)
 Sarah Thomas (2005–2019) – first female head of Bryanston
 Mark Mortimer (2019–2021)
 Richard Jones (2021–present)

Other notable teachers
 David Briggs (1917–2020), classics (1946–1959)
 Don Potter (1902–2004), sculpture and pottery (1940–1984)

Old Bryanstonians

Alumni of the school are known as Old Bryanstonians; there is an alumni organisation called the Bryanston Society. "The Society exists to further the cause of Bryanston in the broadest possible sense. It aims to bring together the whole Bryanston family through social and sporting events."

Other information
 The school estate has Europe's tallest London Plane tree (160 ft). 
 Each year, the JACT Ancient Greek Summer School is held at Bryanston; the school has played host to many of the United Kingdom's classicists, both as teachers and pupils.
 The school hosts the annual Dorset Opera Festival, which combines amateur and professional performers. Operas are staged at the conclusion of a two-week summer school.

See also

 List of independent schools in the United Kingdom
 Canford School, a boarding school in Dorset
 R. Norman Shaw (1831–1912), architect of the main building
 The Coade Hall, a theatre at the school

References

Further reading
 The Burning Bow, Thorold F. Coade. London: Allen & Unwin (1966). .
 Bryanston Reflections: Et nova et vetera, Angela Holdsworth (editor). London: Third Millennium Publishing (2005). .

External links

 Bryanston School website
 
 
 Dorset Life article on the history of the school building
 Leading sculptors mark school's 75th birthday, The Guardian, 2 June 2003

Houses completed in 1894
Boarding schools in Dorset
Educational institutions established in 1928
Member schools of the Headmasters' and Headmistresses' Conference
Private schools in Dorset
International Baccalaureate schools in England
Grade I listed buildings in Dorset
Richard Norman Shaw buildings
1928 establishments in England